The Buffalo Sabres are a professional ice hockey team based in Buffalo, New York. The Sabres compete in the National Hockey League (NHL) as a member of the Atlantic Division in the Eastern Conference. The team was established in 1970, along with the Vancouver Canucks, when the league expanded to 14 teams. The Sabres have played their home games at KeyBank Center since 1996, having previously played at the Buffalo Memorial Auditorium since their inception. The Sabres are owned by Terry Pegula, who purchased the club in 2011 from Tom Golisano.

The team has twice advanced to the Stanley Cup Finals, losing to the Philadelphia Flyers in 1975 and to the Dallas Stars in 1999. The Sabres, along with the Canucks, are the oldest active NHL franchises to have never won the Stanley Cup. The Sabres have the longest active playoff drought in the NHL, at eleven seasons, which stands as an NHL record.

History

Early years and the French Connection (1970–1981) 
The Sabres, along with the Vancouver Canucks, joined the NHL in the 1970–71 season. Their first owners were Seymour H. Knox III and Northrup Knox, scions of a family long prominent in Western New York and grandsons of the co-founders of the Woolworth's variety store chain; along with Robert O. Swados, a Buffalo attorney. On the team's inaugural board of directors were Robert E. Rich Jr., later the owner of the Buffalo Bisons minor league baseball team; and George W. Strawbridge Jr., an heir to the Campbell Soup Company fortune. Buffalo had a history of professional hockey; immediately prior to the Sabres' establishment, the Buffalo Bisons were a pillar of the American Hockey League (AHL), having existed since 1940 (and before that, another Bisons hockey team played from 1928 to 1936), winning the Calder Cup in their final season.

Wanting a name other than "bison" (a generic stock name used by Buffalo sports teams for decades), the Knoxes commissioned a name-the-team contest. With names like "Mugwumps", "Buzzing Bees" and "Flying Zeppelins" being entered, the winning choice, "Sabres", was chosen because Seymour Knox felt a sabre, a weapon carried by a leader, could be effective on offense and defense. The Knoxes tried twice before to get an NHL team, first when the NHL expanded in 1967, and again when they attempted to purchase the Oakland Seals with the intent of moving them to Buffalo. Their first attempt was thwarted when Pittsburgh Steelers owner Art Rooney persuaded his horse racing friends James and Bruce Norris to select Pittsburgh over Buffalo, while the second attempt was due to the NHL not wanting an expansion market to give up on a team so soon, nor isolate the Los Angeles Kings (the only NHL team other than the Seals west of St. Louis at the time) from the rest of the NHL entirely. At the time of their creation, the Sabres exercised their option to create their own AHL farm team, the Cincinnati Swords. Former Toronto Maple Leafs general manager and head coach Punch Imlach was hired in the same capacity with the Sabres.

The year the Sabres debuted (1970) was an important year for major league sports in Buffalo. In addition to the Sabres' debut, the Buffalo Bills officially joined the National Football League, and the National Basketball Association's Buffalo Braves also began to play, sharing Memorial Auditorium with the Sabres. The city of Buffalo went from having no teams in the established major professional sports leagues to three in one off-season, a situation that proved to be unsustainable. Between the Braves and the Sabres, the Sabres would prove to be by far the more successful of the two; Paul Snyder, the nouveau riche Braves owner, publicly feuded with the old money Knoxes and the local college basketball scene, eventually losing those feuds and being forced to sell his team in 1976. Subsequent owners of the Braves, in a series of convoluted transactions tied to the ABA–NBA merger, moved the team out of Buffalo.

When the Sabres debuted as an expansion team, they took the ice to Aram Khachaturian's Armenian war dance, "Sabre Dance". The music has been associated with the team as an unofficial anthem ever since. It is often played between periods and after goals.

The consensus was that the first pick in the 1970 NHL Amateur Draft would be junior phenomenon Gilbert Perreault. Either the Sabres or the Canucks would get the first pick, to be determined with the spin of a wheel of fortune. Perreault was available to the Sabres and Canucks as this was the first year the Montreal Canadiens did not have a priority right to draft Quebec-born junior players.

The Canucks were allocated numbers 1–10 on the wheel, while the Sabres had 11–20. When league president Clarence Campbell spun the wheel, he initially thought the pointer landed on one. While Campbell was congratulating the Vancouver delegation, Imlach asked Campbell to check again. As it turned out, the pointer was on 11, effectively handing Perreault to the Sabres. Perreault scored 38 goals in his rookie season of 1970–71, at the time a record for most goals scored by a NHL rookie, and he received the Calder Memorial Trophy as the NHL's rookie of the year. Despite Perreault's play, the Sabres finished well out of playoff contention.

In the team's second season, 1971–72, rookie Rick Martin, drafted fifth overall by Buffalo in 1971, and Rene Robert, acquired in a late-season trade from the Pittsburgh Penguins, joined Perreault and would become one of the league's top forward lines in the 1970s. Martin broke Perreault's record at once with 44 rookie goals. They were nicknamed "The French Connection" after the movie of the same name and in homage to their French-Canadian roots. The Sabres made the playoffs for the first time in 1972–73, just the team's third year in the league, but lost in the quarterfinals in six games to the eventual Stanley Cup champion Montreal Canadiens.

After a subpar year in 1974 that saw them miss the playoffs (as well as aging defenseman Tim Horton's death in a DUI-induced car accident), the Sabres tied for the best record in the NHL in the 1974–75 regular season. Buffalo advanced to the Stanley Cup Finals for the first time in team history to play against the rough Philadelphia Flyers (who had been recently nicknamed the "Broad Street Bullies"), a series which included the legendary Fog Game (Game 3 of the series). Due to unusual heat in Buffalo in May 1975 and the lack of air conditioning in the Buffalo Memorial Auditorium, parts of the game were played in heavy fog that made players, officials, and the puck invisible to many spectators. During a face-off and through the fog, Sabres center Jim Lorentz spotted a bat flying across the rink, swung at it with his stick, killing it. It was the only time that any player killed an animal during an NHL game. The Sabres won that game thanks to Rene Robert's goal in overtime. However, Philadelphia would wind up taking the Stanley Cup in six games, winning the series 4–2.

The French Connection, joined by 50–goal scorer Danny Gare, continued to score prolifically for the Sabres in 1975–76, but the team lost in the quarterfinals to the New York Islanders. The Sabres had success through the late 1970s behind Gare and the French Connection (Perreault, Martin and Robert), but they were unable to return to the Finals despite a Wales Conference championship in 1980 and being the first team to beat the Soviet Olympic Team when they toured the United States. The French Connection era ended with Robert's trade to the Colorado Rockies in 1979 and Martin's trade to the Los Angeles Kings in 1981, by which time Martin's career was essentially finished as the result of a devastating knee injury in 1980. All three players have had their sweater numbers (11, 7 and 14, respectively) retired and a statue erected in their honor at KeyBank Center in 2012.

Adams/Northeast Division rivalries (1981–1996) 

In 1981–82, the NHL realigned its conferences and adopted an intra-divisional playoff format for the first two rounds. It was the beginning of an era in which the Sabres would finish in the middle of the Adams Division standings with regularity, and then face the near-certainty of having to get past either the Boston Bruins or Canadiens to make it to the conference finals. Aside from first-round victories over Montreal in 1982–83 and Boston in 1992–93, the era saw the Sabres lose to division rivals Boston, the Quebec Nordiques and Montreal in the Adams Division semi-finals (first round) a combined eight times, and miss the playoffs altogether in 1985–86 and 1986–87—only third and fourth times out of the playoffs in franchise history. Perrault reached the 500-goal mark in the 1985–86 season and retired after playing 20 games in 1986–87, 17 years after joining the Sabres as their first draft pick.

The Sabres drafted Pierre Turgeon with the first pick in the 1987 NHL Entry Draft, and he quickly made an impact with the team. During his rookie season in 1987–88, he helped the Sabres reach the playoffs for the first time in three years. He was joined in 1989 by Alexander Mogilny, who with the help of Sabres officials became the first Soviet player to defect to the NHL, and cleared the way for all other Russian players to follow. In the 1989–90 season, the Sabres would improve to finish with 98 points—third-best in the NHL—but the playoff futility continued with a first-round loss to Montreal. The Sabres traded Turgeon to the New York Islanders in 1991 as part of a blockbuster seven-player trade that brought Pat LaFontaine to Buffalo.

In 1992–93, goaltender Dominik Hasek joined the team in a trade from the Chicago Blackhawks. In the 1993 playoffs, the Sabres upset the Bruins in a four-game sweep in the Adams Division semi-finals, their first playoff series victory in ten years. Brad May's series-winning goal in overtime of Game 4 in Buffalo was made famous by Rick Jeanneret's "May Day!" call. However, the eventual Stanley Cup champion Montreal Canadiens swept the Sabres in the division final, with the Sabres losing all four games by a 4–3 score (the last three games in overtime).

With the NHL adopting a conference playoff format for the 1993–94 season, the Sabres faced the New Jersey Devils in the Eastern Conference playoffs' first round. Despite Hasek winning a 1–0 (quadruple overtime) goaltending duel with the Devils' Martin Brodeur in Game 6—the Sabres' longest game ever, which went into quadruple overtime—Buffalo would lose the series in seven games. Another first-round playoff loss to the Philadelphia Flyers in the lockout-shortened 1994–95 season was followed by a fifth-place finish in the Northeast Division in 1995–96, as the team missed the playoffs for the first time in nine years. It was the first season under head coach Ted Nolan and the last for the Sabres at Buffalo Memorial Auditorium. Nolan brought an exciting brand of hockey to Buffalo. During his coaching tenure, Buffalo was referred to as the "hardest-working team in hockey". This season also featured the debut of "walk-on" veteran Randy Burridge, who earned a spot on the roster after he attended training camp on a try-out basis. He scored 25 goals that season and was second in team scoring to Pat LaFontaine. Burridge also earned the Tim Horton Award for being the unsung hero and was voted team Most Valuable Player.

The final game in Memorial Auditorium was played on April 14, 1996, a 4–1 victory over the Hartford Whalers. Sabres principal owner Seymour Knox died a month later, on May 22, 1996.

The black and red era (1996–2006) 

Ted Nolan and the Sabres rebounded in 1996–97, their first at Marine Midland Arena, by winning their first division title in 16 years, with Nolan winning the Jack Adams Award as the NHL's top coach, Dominik Hasek winning both the Hart and Vezina Trophies (the first goaltender to do so since Montreal's Jacques Plante in 1962), Michael Peca taking home the Frank J. Selke Trophy as the best defensive forward in the NHL and general manager John Muckler honored as Executive of the Year.

However, the regular-season success was overshadowed by what had taken place during the playoffs. Tensions between Nolan and Hasek had been high for most of the season. After being scored upon in Game 3 of the first round against the Ottawa Senators, Hasek left the game, forcing backup Steve Shields to step in. Hasek claimed he felt his knee pop, and the team doctor pronounced him day-to-day. The Buffalo News columnist Jim Kelley wrote a column that night for the next day's newspaper that detailed the day's events, which irked Hasek. After the Senators won Game 5, Hasek came out of the Sabres' training room and attacked Kelley, tearing his shirt. Despite the fact Hasek issued an apology, things went downhill after the incident. Shields starred as the Sabres rallied to win the series against Ottawa. But before the next series against the Philadelphia Flyers, the NHL announced Hasek had been suspended for three games, with the Sabres informing the NHL Hasek was healthy (Hasek most likely would not have been suspended had he not been cleared to play). Set to return in Game 4 with the Sabres down by three games to none, Hasek told the Sabres' coaching staff he felt a twinge in his knee and left the ice after the pre-game skate. Shields turned in another season-saving performance as Buffalo staved off elimination with a win in overtime. Again before Game 5, Hasek declared himself unfit to play and Buffalo lost 6–3 and the series.

Team president Larry Quinn fired general manager John Muckler, who had a noted feud with Nolan. Hasek, who supported Muckler, openly told reporters at the NHL Awards Ceremony he did not respect Nolan, placing new general manager Darcy Regier in a tough position. He offered Nolan just a one-year contract for a reported $500,000. Nolan refused on the grounds his previous contract was for two years. Regier then pulled the contract off the table and did not offer another one, ending Nolan's tenure as Sabres coach. Nolan was offered several jobs from the Tampa Bay Lightning and New York Islanders, which he turned down, and was out of the NHL until June 2006 when he was named coach of the Islanders. Former Sabres captain Lindy Ruff was hired as head coach on July 21, 1997, agreeing to a three-year contract. The Sabres organization, after having their most successful season in nearly two decades, had fired both the reigning NHL Executive of the Year (Muckler) and Coach of the Year (Nolan).

New owners and return to the Finals 
During the 1997–98 season, the Sabres, which had lost $32 million over the previous three seasons and nearly missed payroll in December 1997, were sold by Northrop Knox to John Rigas, owner of Adelphia Communications. Shortly thereafter, Quinn was dismissed and replaced by John Rigas' son, Timothy Rigas. Behind Hasek, left-winger Miroslav Satan (who led the team in scoring), right-winger Donald Audette, center Michael Peca and several role-playing journeymen including Matthew Barnaby, the Sabres reached the Eastern Conference Finals that season, but lost to the Washington Capitals in six games.

In 1998–99, Miroslav Satan scored 40 goals. The Sabres would add centers Stu Barnes from the Pittsburgh Penguins and Joe Juneau from the Capitals. Michal Grosek had the best season of his career, and the team finally returned to the Stanley Cup Finals, this time against the Presidents' Trophy winner, the Dallas Stars. In Game 6, Stars winger Brett Hull's triple-overtime goal ended the series, and the Stars were awarded the Cup. In 1999, it was illegal to score a goal if an offensive player's skate entered the crease before the puck did. However, NHL officials maintained that Hull's two shots in the goal mouth constituted a single possession of the puck since the puck deflected off Hasek. The rule was changed for the following season, allowing players to be inside the goaltender's crease as long as they do not interfere with the goaltender.

The next year was a disappointing season. The team struggled in the regular season, due to injuries to Hasek as well as other tired and discouraged players. Doug Gilmour was acquired from the Chicago Blackhawks at the trade deadline and sparked the Sabres to a playoff berth. However, Gilmour was stricken by stomach flu during the postseason, and even Hasek's return could not prevent a first-round playoff series loss to the Philadelphia Flyers. Like the previous season, there would be an officiating controversy. In Game 2, Flyers left wing John LeClair put the puck in the net through a hole in the mesh. While replays appeared to show the puck entering through the "side" of the net, the goal was allowed to stand. The Flyers would win the game 2–1 and go on to win the series four games to one.

Captain Michael Peca sat out 2000–01 due to a contract dispute, and was later traded to the New York Islanders in June 2001 in exchange for Tim Connolly and Taylor Pyatt. Even so, the Sabres still defeated Philadelphia in six games in the first round of the playoffs (with a resounding 8–0 victory in the series-winning game). In the second round, they faced the underdog Pittsburgh Penguins, led by rejuvenated superstar Mario Lemieux and captain Jaromir Jagr, who had won his fifth Art Ross Trophy that season, losing on a seventh-game overtime goal scored by defenseman Darius Kasparaitis. After lengthy and failed negotiations with their star goaltender, the Sabres traded Hasek to the Detroit Red Wings in the summer of 2001, bringing a five-year era of playoff success to a close. Without Hasek and Peca, the Sabres missed the 2002 playoffs.

Ownership turmoil and lockout 
In May 2002, John Rigas and his sons were indicted for bank, wire and securities fraud for embezzling more than $2 billion from Adelphia. Rigas was later convicted and presently is appealing a sentence of 15 years in prison. The NHL took control of the team, though the Rigas family remained owners on paper. For a while, there were no interested buyers. After the two-year period of uncertainty, including rumors of relocating to another city or even straight out folding, the team was sold to a consortium led by Rochester, New York, billionaire and former New York gubernatorial candidate Tom Golisano and former Sabres president Larry Quinn, whose bid included no government funding. Golisano was introduced as team owner on March 19, 2003.

With the 2002–03 season having started under NHL control, general manager Darcy Regier could make only minimal moves. However, with the consultations of impending new ownership, the team began their rebuilding process around the March 2003 trade deadline by clearing out veteran players. The first to go was winger Rob Ray, who was sent to the Ottawa Senators. The team then sent center and team captain Stu Barnes to the Dallas Stars in exchange for young winger Michael Ryan and a draft pick.

A third deal sent center Chris Gratton to the Phoenix Coyotes with a draft pick for Daniel Briere and a draft pick, adding a player who would play a key role in the Sabres' resurgence in later years. The 2003–04 season saw the team emerge from its financial struggles and, though the Sabres narrowly missed the playoffs, the development of prominent young players. Although the 2004–05 NHL season was canceled due to a labor dispute, the league and the National Hockey League Players' Association (NHLPA) were able to agree on a new collective bargaining agreement in the summer of 2005, thus enabling NHL hockey to return for the 2005–06 season.

On January 19, 2005, the Sabres lost their main cable television broadcaster, as the Empire Sports Network (which had been on the air since 1991) ceased operations in a cost-cutting move during the Adelphia scandal and reorganization. (Like the Sabres, Empire had been owned by Adelphia prior to the NHL's seizure of the franchise.) Adelphia sold their rights to Sabres telecasts and for the 2005–06 campaign Madison Square Garden Network (MSG), a New York City-based channel which broadcasts New York Rangers, New York Islanders and New Jersey Devils games, took over the rights to broadcast Sabres games to television viewers in western New York, with the Sabres controlling all aspects of the broadcast. The agreement was later extended through 2017, then again through 2027.

In 2005–06, the Sabres took off, finishing with their best record in over 20 years and clinching their first playoff berth since the 2000–01 season. The team finished the regular season with 52 wins, surpassing the 50-win mark for the first time in franchise history. They also finished with 110 points, their first 100-point season in 23 years and tied the 1979–80 club for the second-best point total in franchise history. The Sabres tied the Ottawa Senators and Carolina Hurricanes for the most wins in the Eastern Conference. They finished with the fifth-best record in the NHL, behind Detroit, Ottawa, Dallas and Carolina.

Buffalo defeated the Philadelphia Flyers in the first round of the 2006 playoffs in six games and top-seeded Ottawa in five games. The Sabres advanced to play Carolina in their first Eastern Conference Final since 1999. However, injuries began to mount. They were forced to play without four of their top defensemen (Teppo Numminen, Dmitri Kalinin, Jay McKee and Henrik Tallinder) and their top powerplay scorer (Tim Connolly) for much of the series. Despite this, the Sabres forced the series to seven games before falling to the eventual Stanley Cup champions Carolina. The Sabres' impressive season was recognized on June 22, 2006, at the NHL Awards Ceremony when Lindy Ruff edged Hurricanes coach Peter Laviolette to win the Jack Adams Award as Coach of the Year in the closest vote in the award's history. Ruff was the second Sabres coach to win the award.

Return to blue and gold (2006–2010) 

The Sabres started the 2006–07 season 10–0, setting a new franchise record for consecutive wins to start a season, and becoming just the second team in NHL history (after the 1993–94 Toronto Maple Leafs) to open a season with a ten-game winning streak. They also set a new NHL record for consecutive road wins to start a season (eight), which was extended to ten games (tying the team record for consecutive road wins) with a 7–4 win over the Carolina Hurricanes on November 13, 2006. The team reached the 50-win plateau for the second time in franchise history. The Sabres won the presidents' Trophy for the first time in franchise history, giving them the home-ice advantage for their entire run in the 2007 playoffs. They also tied the 1974–75 team's franchise record for points in a season. The team defeated the New York Islanders and the New York Rangers to reach their second consecutive Eastern Conference Finals. However, on May 19, they were eliminated by the Ottawa Senators after five games.

In the April 9, 2007, issue of ESPN the Magazine, the team ranked first of 122 major professional sports franchises in North America. The Sabres were cited for their player accessibility, low ticket prices and exciting brand of hockey.

Post-Briere–Drury era 

On July 1, 2007, the Sabres lost both co-captains, with Daniel Briere going to the Philadelphia Flyers and Chris Drury going to the New York Rangers as free agents. The team also nearly lost Thomas Vanek to the Edmonton Oilers, which offered him a seven-year, $50 million offer sheet, but the Sabres matched the offer on July 6. After these events, the team changed its policy of not negotiating contracts during the regular season. Long-time Sabres broadcast color commentator Jim Lorentz announced his retirement during the preseason. Hockey Night in Canadas Harry Neale took over the position in October 2007.

During the 2007–08 season, the Sabres hosted a game against the Pittsburgh Penguins on January 1, 2008, which was played outdoors at Ralph Wilson Stadium, home of the National Football League's Buffalo Bills. Officially, the game was called the AMP Energy NHL Winter Classic, known colloquially as the "Ice Bowl" due to it taking place at the same time as college football bowl games. The Sabres lost 2–1 in a shootout. The Sabres failed to qualify for the 2008 playoffs and became only the third team in NHL history to go from finishing first overall in the regular season standings to finishing out of the playoffs the following year.

On June 10, the Sabres officially announced their new AHL affiliate, beginning in the 2008–09 season, would be the Portland Pirates from Portland, Maine. This ended their 29-year affiliation with the Rochester Americans. They signed with the Pirates for two seasons, with a parent club option for a third. The Sabres entered the 2008 free agency period quietly, but on July 1, signed goaltender Patrick Lalime to a two-year contract. Three days later, the Sabres acquired Craig Rivet from the San Jose Sharks in exchange for a second-round draft pick in each of the next two drafts. The Sabres also extended the contracts of three players: Paul Gaustad (four years), Ryan Miller (five years) and Jason Pominville (five years). Miller was slated to become an unrestricted free agent following the upcoming season while Pominville was set to become a restricted free agent.

On October 8, the Sabres named defenseman Craig Rivet team captain, the first single full-time captain since Stu Barnes' term from 2001 to 2003. The team was also active at the trade deadline. First, they signed Tim Connolly to a two-year, $4.2 million extension, then acquired Mikael Tellqvist from the Phoenix Coyotes for a fourth-round pick in the 2010 draft. Dominic Moore came from the Toronto Maple Leafs for a second-round pick in the 2009 draft, then Buffalo received a second-round pick in the 2009 draft from the Edmonton Oilers in exchange for Ales Kotalik. On April 9, the Buffalo Sabres were eliminated from the playoffs.

General manager Darcy Regier announced on the first day of free agency for the following season the Sabres had signed unrestricted free agent defenseman Steve Montador to a two-year contract. They also signed free agent defenseman Joe DiPenta to a one-year contract on July 11, and extended contracts with three other players: Andrej Sekera to a multi-year deal, Clarke MacArthur to a one-year contract, and Mike Grier to a one-year contract. Grier, having played two seasons with the Sabres, returned after playing the last three with the San Jose Sharks.

At the beginning of the season, the Sabres announced the Buffalo Sabres Road Crew, which saw appearances by the Sabres' coaching staff, general manager Darcy Regier and broadcasting crew for charity. Four stops were scheduled throughout the season in Tampa, Florida, Washington, D.C., Raleigh, North Carolina, and Atlanta at established Buffalo fan clubs. Many native western New Yorkers live in those four cities; Sabres fans have been known to have large contingents in attendance, rivaling those of the home teams when playing in Raleigh and Tampa.

After only playing two games with Buffalo that season, Daniel Paille was traded to the Boston Bruins on October 20, 2009, in exchange for a third-round and a conditional fourth-round draft selection. Paille's move to Boston marked the first ever trade of a player under contract between the two division rivals in their common 39 years in the NHL. On January 1, the Sabres became the first team to win consecutive games when trailing by three or more goals since the Dallas Stars did it in 2005–06; Buffalo defeated the Atlanta Thrashers 4–3 in overtime. It was Buffalo's second straight win in a game it trailed 3–0, following a 4–3 victory over the Pittsburgh Penguins. On March 3, the day of the trade deadline, the Sabres made two deals. The first was with the Columbus Blue Jackets, which sent them Raffi Torres in exchange for Nathan Paetsch and a second-round draft pick. The Sabres' second and final deal sent Clarke MacArthur to the Atlanta Thrashers for third- and fourth-round draft picks. On March 27, the Sabres clinched their first playoff berth since 2006–07 with a 7–1 rout of the Tampa Bay Lightning. On April 6, the Sabres clinched the Northeast Division title by defeating the New York Rangers by a score of 5–2. On April 26, the third-seed Sabres were eliminated from the Stanley Cup playoffs by the sixth-seeded Boston Bruins in six games.

The 2010–11 roster did not have many significant changes; one of the most notable was the team's decision to waive center Tim Kennedy, a Buffalo native, to avoid paying the award he won in arbitration. Defensemen Henrik Tallinder and Toni Lydman were allowed to leave as free agents, while the team signed veterans Jordan Leopold and Shaone Morrisonn to replace them. Additionally, center Rob Niedermayer was added as a Stanley Cup-winning, veteran presence.

The Pegula era (2010–present)

On November 30, 2010, Ken Campbell of The Hockey News reported a story that billionaire Terry Pegula had signed a letter of intent to purchase the Sabres for US$150 million. Pegula was the founder, president and CEO of East Resources, one of the largest privately held companies in the United States before he sold the company. After the report was released, Sabres managing partner Larry Quinn claimed it was "untrue" but refused further comment. The $150 million was later determined to be an undervalued amount, as Forbes magazine had valued the team at just under $170 million in 2010. In December, Pegula officially expressed interest in buying the Sabres for $170 million and submitted a letter of intent to the NHL. In January, Golisano reportedly issued a counteroffer with an asking price of US$175 million. Pegula and Golisano reached an agreement to sell the team on January 29, 2011, with Pegula purchasing the team for $189 million ($175 million with $14 million in debt included) with the Sabres and Golisano officially making an announcement in a press conference on February 3, 2011. NHL owners approved the sale on February 18.

In the conference, it was stated that an unnamed bidder submitted a much higher bid than Pegula's, but made the bid contingent upon moving the team. The description is consistent with that of Jim Balsillie, who has made public his efforts to move a team to Hamilton, Ontario, a move the Sabres have actively opposed. Terry Pegula named former Pittsburgh Penguins executive Ted Black to be team president. Pegula was introduced as the Sabres' owner in a public ceremony at HSBC Arena on February 23, accompanied by what would be the final appearance of all three members of The French Connection before Rick Martin's death three weeks later. Around the 2010–11 trade deadline, the team attempted to trade Craig Rivet, but was unsuccessful. After initially clearing waivers, Rivet entered re-entry waivers and was claimed by the Columbus Blue Jackets. Late on February 27, the team acquired Brad Boyes from the St. Louis Blues in exchange for a second-round draft pick. This was the Sabres' sole trade of the deadline. After Pegula's official takeover of the team, the Sabres finished the regular season 16–4–4, never losing two consecutive games in that span, and landed the seventh seed in the Eastern Conference. Pegula's approach was credited by players, fans and the public with bringing new energy to the team, sparking a run to the playoffs that seemed improbable only months earlier. On April 8, the Sabres clinched a playoff berth for the second consecutive season, defeating the Philadelphia Flyers 4–3 in overtime. The Sabres clinched the seventh seed and faced Philadelphia in the first round. The Sabres had a three games to two lead but lost the series in seven games.

Playoff drought record
The Sabres began the 2011–12 season as part of the NHL premiere series for the first time, playing games in Finland and Germany. The team was particularly well-received during a game against Adler Mannheim in Mannheim, the hometown of Sabres forward Jochen Hecht; a contingent of 65 Adler fans traveled from Germany to Buffalo in February 2012 to witness a Sabres game against the Boston Bruins. Prior to the first game, Lindy Ruff named Jason Pominville the Sabres' 13th full-time captain in team history. The Sabres began the season relatively strong but collapsed after a Boston Bruins game in which Bruins forward Milan Lucic hit and injured goaltender Ryan Miller; the subsequent months saw the Sabres collapse to last place in the Eastern Conference. Despite a two-month rally that began in February along with the emergence of rookie forward Marcus Foligno, the Sabres lost the last two games of the regular season and fell three points short of a playoff spot.

The 2012–13 NHL lockout eliminated the first part of the 2012–13 season, which ultimately began with a scheduled 48 games. After a 6–10–1 start to the season, the contract of long-time head coach Lindy Ruff was terminated by general manager Darcy Regier on February 20, 2013, ending 16 seasons as head coach. Ruff was replaced by Ron Rolston first on an interim basis, then permanently after the season ended. Due to the lockout-shortened season, the trade deadline was moved to April 3, 2013. In the days leading up to it, the Sabres were active in trades. On March 15, the Sabres' first trade sent T. J. Brennan to the Florida Panthers in exchange for a fifth-round pick (originally owned by the Los Angeles Kings) in the 2013 draft. On March 30, the Sabres traded Jordan Leopold to the St. Louis Blues in exchange for a second-round pick and a conditional fifth-round pick in the 2013 draft. On April 1, the Sabres traded Robyn Regehr to the Los Angeles Kings in exchange for two-second round draft choices (one in 2014 and the other in 2015). The final trade came on the day of the trade deadline, April 3, where the Sabres sent Jason Pominville to the Minnesota Wild for Johan Larsson and Matt Hackett. The official announcement came after the 3 pm deadline. At the time of the official announcement, it was not clear if there were other parts of the deal as the trade was still pending NHL approval. It was later revealed that draft picks were also involved in the deal: the Wild would receive a fourth-round pick in the 2014 draft, and the Sabres would receive a first-round pick in the 2013 draft and a second-round pick in the 2014 draft.

The following season, on November 13, 2013, the team dismissed general manager Darcy Regier and head coach Ron Rolston. Former Sabres head coach Ted Nolan was named interim head coach for the remainder of the season (he later signed a three-year contract extension) and Pat LaFontaine was named president of hockey operations. On January 9, 2014, Tim Murray was named general manager. On February 28, 2014, Murray made his first major trade, sending star goaltender Ryan Miller and Captain Steve Ott to the St. Louis Blues in exchange for goaltender Jaroslav Halak, forwards Chris Stewart and William Carrier and two draft picks. After just over three months as president of hockey operations, Pat LaFontaine resigned from the Sabres to return to his previous position with the NHL on March 1, 2014. Among highlights in the otherwise bad 2013–14 season included the "butt goal" in which a severely short-staffed Sabres won their December 23 contest against the Phoenix Coyotes when Coyotes goaltender Mike Smith backed into his own goal with the puck lodged in his pants, and the lone NHL appearance of former Lancaster High School goaltender Ryan Vinz, who was working as a videographer in the Sabres organization, to suit up as a backup goaltender in the wake of the Ryan Miller trade. The Sabres finished the 2013–14 season last in the NHL and again missed the playoffs.

Despite winning two more games than the previous season, the 2014–15 season was much like the previous one, with the team sitting near the bottom of the standings the entire season, and finishing last in the NHL. On March 26, 2015, during a 4–3 overtime loss to the Arizona Coyotes, spectators at the game, ostensibly fans of the Sabres, cheered after a game-winning goal by Coyotes centre Sam Gagner. Said fans were more eager to see the team lose (the Sabres and Coyotes were 29th and 30th in the standings at the time) in the hopes that it would ensure the team would deliberately lose to finish in last place and guarantee a top-two pick in the 2015 NHL Entry Draft, which included two extremely highly touted prospects, Connor McDavid and Jack Eichel. These spectators' "embrace the tank" philosophy led to criticism from the media and Sabres players for how the fans reacted. However, some praised the fans for how they reacted, saying that they "did the right thing". The Sabres clinched last place (and therefore a top-two pick) with a loss to the Columbus Blue Jackets on April 10 (this was later confirmed to be a number-two pick after the team, for the second year in a row, lost the draft lottery); the team used the pick to select Eichel. Murray fired Nolan at the end of the season, citing a lack of chemistry and lukewarm relations between them. On May 28, 2015, Dan Bylsma was hired as the 17th head coach in franchise history.

The hiring of Bylsma, the drafting of Eichel and 2014 second overall pick Sam Reinhart, the acquisition of star centerman Ryan O'Reilly in the offseason, and the rising performance of youngsters Zemgus Girgensons, Jake McCabe and Rasmus Ristolainen resulted in an improved season in 2015–16. Even though the Sabres again missed the playoffs for the fifth consecutive season, the team managed to finish just under .500 in points percentage while fans and critics have praised these rebuilding efforts by Sabres general manager Tim Murray.

In mid-2016, the team announced that its television broadcasts would be spun off to their own regional sports network, MSG Western New York. The new network continues to operate under the MSG banner but under Pegula Sports and Entertainment control and features additional programs centered around the Sabres and the Buffalo Bills, which the Pegulas purchased separately in 2014. The team failed to make significant progress, and in fact slightly regressed, in 2016–17, missing the playoffs for the sixth consecutive season, leading to the firings of both head coach Dan Bylsma and general manager Tim Murray on April 20, 2017.

During the 2017 off-season, the Sabres hired two of their former players as head coach and general manager: Jason Botterill as general manager and Phil Housley as head coach. Among the more notable roster changes for this season was the return of former scoring leader Jason Pominville to the team in a trade that brought him and defenseman Marco Scandella to Buffalo in exchange for sending forwards Tyler Ennis and Marcus Foligno to the Minnesota Wild.

On January 1, 2018, the Sabres participated in the 2018 NHL Winter Classic, losing 3–2 in overtime to the New York Rangers.

In the 2017–18 season, Buffalo finished in last place in the NHL for the third time in five seasons and won the draft lottery for the 2018 NHL Entry Draft for the first time since 1987, using the pick to select Rasmus Dahlin from Frölunda HC of the Swedish Hockey League.

On November 27, 2018, the Sabres became the first team in NHL history to lead the league in points after the first 25 games of the season after finishing last in the league the previous season. The team won 10 games in a row for the first time since the 2006–07 season and tied the franchise record. Jeff Skinner became the seventh player in franchise history to score 20 or more goals in less than 27 games, and only the second player to score 20 goals before December. The team then collapsed and missed the playoffs, leading to Housley's firing at the end of the season.

On March 21, 2019, it was announced that the Sabres would play the Tampa Bay Lightning in the 2019 NHL Global Series at Ericsson Globe in Stockholm, Sweden. Ralph Krueger was named the Sabres head coach in May 2019.

On June 16, 2020, Botterill was fired as general manager of the Sabres and replaced by Kevyn Adams.

On March 17, 2021, in the midst on a twelve-game losing streak, head coach Ralph Krueger was fired. Don Granato was named interim head coach. After continuing to lose games, on March 29, 2021, the Sabres tied the Pittsburgh Penguins' all-time NHL losing streak of 18 games from the 2003–04 season after blowing a 3–0 lead in the third period against the Philadelphia Flyers and subsequently losing in overtime; it is the longest losing streak since the shootout was introduced. Granato was named the permanent head coach at the end of the season.

In the 2021–22 season, The Sabres would once again missed the playoffs for the 11th consecutive year, an NHL record.

 Team information 

 Logo and uniforms 
The Sabres have had, for the most part, used a primary logo featuring a bison atop two crossed sabres in a blue circle with gold trim. This logo was first used from 1970 to 1996 and was restored in 2020 after the Sabres 50th anniversary season was complete.

Throughout their 26-year tenure at the Buffalo Auditorium, the Sabres have worn white uniforms with a blue and gold shoulder yoke and alternating gold, white and blue stripes. On the road they wore blue uniforms with gold stripes. In 1978 the primary logo was added on the shoulders.

Upon moving to what is now KeyBank Center (formerly Marine Midland and HSBC Arena, later First Niagara Center) in 1996, the Sabres changed their logo and colors. Red, black and silver replaced blue and gold while the primary "bison head" logo was unveiled as the primary logo. Black road (later home) and white home (later road) uniforms were also released featuring a bull's head silhouette design in front and the "Sabre B" alternate logo on the shoulders.

The first third jersey of the Buffalo Sabres was created in 2000. The primary color was Sabre red, with black and silver stripes on the sleeves. It also featured the word "Buffalo" written on a black stripe outlined by silver near the waist. The logo was a black circle with two sabres crossing each other (a nod to the original logo).

On October 7, 2001, the Sabres wore a modified version of their white jerseys in a road game against the New York Rangers. The uniform replaced the "bison head" with the "NEW YORK" diagonal wordmark as a tribute to the state of New York in the wake of the September 11 attacks.

On September 16, 2006, the Sabres unveiled new home and away jerseys featuring midnight blue, maize (gold), silver and white colors. Front chest numbers were also added. The new logo, a stylized bison, was widely reviled, drawing unfavorable comparisons to a banana slug (hence the nickname "Buffaslug"). Despite the criticism, five of the top ten player jerseys sold in the first two months of the 2006–07 season were Sabres "slug" designs. Nevertheless, the Sabres brought back the classic blue jerseys as a third jersey, but continued to pair the look with the navy helmet and pants. When the Reebok Edge template was unveiled in 2007, the Sabres kept their "Buffaslug" uniforms, but the following season, they released a new third jersey featuring the classic look depicted in the navy, gold, silver and white colors. The Sabres also wore the original white uniforms during the 2008 Winter Classic.

The third jersey eventually became the primary home jersey on September 18, 2010, when the Sabres released a modern version of the classic 1970–1996 logo. A corresponding road white jersey was also released, along with a third jersey featuring an alternate throwback arrangement that pays homage to the AHL's Buffalo Bisons, complete with the team's 40th Anniversary insignia (essentially the original royal blue version of the current logo with the year "1970" inside).

In 2013, the Sabres released a new third jersey, featuring a gold front and navy back design. The uniform only lasted two seasons, after which it was retired.

The Sabres kept their uniforms largely intact when Adidas took over as its supplier, save for the removal of silver sections in the armpits. They were also the only remaining NHL team to sport uniform numbers in front; teams such as the Dallas Stars and San Jose Sharks briefly added numbers in front of their uniforms before removing them altogether.

During the 2018 Winter Classic, the Sabres broke out white uniforms with the classic blue and gold shade, albeit with a different striping scheme from the original uniforms.

The 2019–20 season marked the final season of the navy and gold look, as the Sabres announced the return to royal blue uniforms for the following season. Also, a 50th-anniversary white third jersey was used, featuring metallic gold elements on the logo and stripes.

On August 11, 2020, the Sabres unveiled the uniforms for the upcoming season. The style is similar to the ones worn in the early days of the franchise. Jersey numbers are no longer displayed on the front. The Sabres also released a "Reverse Retro" alternate uniform, bringing back the "crossed swords" alternate from 2000 to 2006 but recolored to the current royal, gold and white scheme.

For the 2022 Heritage Classic, the Sabres again wore a variation of their classic uniforms, but without the blue shoulder yoke and with a cream base.

On August 31, 2022, the Sabres announced that their black uniform used from 1995 to 2006 would become their new third jersey. This same uniform also became the basis of their second "Reverse Retro" uniform, but recolored to the white, blue and gold scheme and featured white pants.

 Broadcasters 

Current

 Dan Dunleavy, play-by-play and intermission interviewer
 Rob Ray, color commentator
 Brian Duff, studio host
 Martin Biron, studio analyst
 Danny Gare, fill-in studio analyst

Past

 Brian Blessing, studio host (1995–2003)
 Ted Darling, TV play-by-play (1970–91) and studio host (1992–93)
 Dave Hodge, radio play-by-play (1970–71)
 Rick Jeanneret, TV and radio play-by-play (1971–2022)
 Jim Lorentz, color commentator (1981–2007)
 Brad May, studio Analyst (2015–2017)
 Josh Mora, studio host (2003–2004)
 Harry Neale, color commentator (2007–2012) and Studio analyst (2012–2013)
 Mike Robitaille, color commentator (1985-1992), TV studio analyst (1989–2014)
 Howard Simon, radio and TV analyst (1986–2004)
 Kevin Sylvester, fill-in play by play, studio host (2005–16)
 Pete Weber, radio play-by-play (1994–96)

 National anthems 
The Canadian and U.S. national anthems are sung before every Sabres home game, regardless if the visiting team is Canadian or American, because Buffalo is adjacent to the Canadian border and many spectators come from Canada. Doug Allen sang the Canadian and US national anthems at most home games (except in cases where there is a conflict with his charitable work for the Wesleyan Church) until resigning in 2021 because of his refusal to take a COVID-19 vaccine. Curtis Cook is the arena's in-game organist. During Tom Golisano's ownership, the team occasionally used the services of singer Ronan Tynan, who sang "God Bless America" while Allen performed the Canadian anthem (in such cases, the U.S. anthem was not performed). When Allen was unavailable, Kevin Kennedy (the regular anthem singer for the Buffalo Bandits) is the usual fill-in; on rare occasions since the Pegulas took over, Black River Entertainment personalities have performed the anthems.

In-game hosting
Rich Gaenzler, morning host at WGRF, took over as in-game host beginning in 2018 before he was fired in 2021 over an unrelated dispute pertaining to his WGRF show, which was canceled at the same time. WBFO personality Jay Moran is the current public address announcer; he succeeded Milt Ellis in the position.

In November 2021, the Sabres added an official team dog, named Rick, a Newfoundland puppy trained as a service animal. Nick was graduated to daily service and succeeded by Nikki, a golden retriever puppy.

 Minor league affiliates 
The Sabres are presently affiliated with two minor league teams, the Rochester Americans of the American Hockey League, and the Cincinnati Cyclones of the ECHL. The Americans play at the Blue Cross Arena in Rochester, New York. Founded in 1956, the Americans were previously the Sabres AHL affiliate from the 1979–80 season to the 2007–08 season. During the original Sabres affiliation, the Americans won three Calder Cup championships and finished as runners-up another six times. They finished out of the playoffs only five times in 28 years. The Sabres became re-affiliated with the Americans starting with the 2011–12 season when after buying the Sabres, Pegula purchased the Americans from former owner Curt Styres.

The Cincinnati Cyclones are based in Cincinnati, Ohio and have been the Sabres ECHL affiliate since the 2017–18 season, after their previous affiliate, the Elmira Jackals, folded. Unlike the Americans, the Cyclones are not owned by Pegula but are instead owned by Nederlander Entertainment. The Sabres previously owned an AHL affiliate in Cincinnati with the Cincinnati Swords in the 1970s.

 Season-by-season record 
This is a partial list of the last five seasons completed by the Sabres. For the full season-by-season history, see List of Buffalo Sabres seasonsNote: GP = Games played, W = Wins, L = Losses, OTL = Overtime Losses/SOL = Shootout Losses, Pts = Points, GF = Goals for, GA = Goals against Players and personnel 
 Current roster 

 Team captains 

 Floyd Smith, 1970–1971
 Gerry Meehan, 1971–1974
 Jim Schoenfeld, 1974–1977
 Danny Gare, 1977–1981
 Gilbert Perreault, 1981–1986
 Lindy Ruff, 1986–1989
 Mike Foligno, 1989–1990
 Mike Ramsey, 1991–1992
 Pat LaFontaine, 1992–1997
 Alexander Mogilny, 1993–1994 
 Michael Peca, 1997–2000
 Stu Barnes, 2001–2003
 Rotating, 2003–2004
 Miroslav Satan, October 2003
 Chris Drury, November 2003
 James Patrick, December 2003
 Jean-Pierre Dumont, January 2004
 Daniel Briere, February 2004
 Chris Drury, March–April 2004
 Daniel Briere and Chris Drury, 2005–2007 
 Rotating, 2007–2008
 Jochen Hecht, October 2007
 Toni Lydman, November 2007
 Brian Campbell, December 2007
 Jaroslav Spacek, January 2008
 Jochen Hecht, February 2008
 Jason Pominville, March–April 2008
 Craig Rivet, 2008–2011
 Jason Pominville, 2011–2013
 Steve Ott and Thomas Vanek, October 2013 
 Steve Ott, 2013–2014
 Brian Gionta, 2014–2017
 Jack Eichel, 2018–2021
 Kyle Okposo, 2022–present

 Front office 

Kevyn Adams, who previously played in the NHL and served as Senior Vice President of Business Administration for the Sabres, was named the team's general manager on June 16, 2020. Kim Pegula, as chief operating officer of Pegula Sports and Entertainment, serves as team president.

 Head coaches 

The Sabres named Don Granato as interim head coach on March 17, 2021, replacing Ralph Krueger who had been fired on the same day. The interim tag was removed at the end of the season.

Of the 18 head coaches the Sabres have used in their history, seven of them had previously played for the Sabres during their playing career: Floyd Smith, Bill Inglis, Jim Schoenfeld, Craig Ramsay, Rick Dudley, Lindy Ruff and Phil Housley. Two others, Dan Bylsma and Ted Nolan, had played in the Sabres' farm system.

 Team and league honors 

 Hockey Hall of Famers 
The Buffalo Sabres has an affiliation with a number of inductees to the Hockey Hall of Fame. Sabres inductees include 11 former players and four builders of the sport. The four individuals recognized as builders by the Hall of Fame includes former general managers, head coaches, and owners. In addition to players and builders, three broadcasters for the Buffalo Sabres were also awarded the Foster Hewitt Memorial Award from the Hockey Hall of Fame, Ted Darling in 1994, Rick Jeanneret in 2012, and Harry Neale in 2013.

Four sports writers from publications based in Buffalo, and St. Catharines, Ontario (which is within Buffalo's media territory), were also awarded the Elmer Ferguson Memorial Award from the Hockey Hall of Fame. Recipients of the award include Charlie Barton (Buffalo Courier-Express) in 1985, Dick Johnston (Buffalo News) in 1986, Jack Gatecliff (St. Catharines Standard) in 1995, and Jim Kelley (Buffalo News'') in 2004.

 Retired numbers 

 1 When the No. 14 of Robert and the No. 7 of Martin were retired, Gilbert Perreault was present, as the entire "French Connection" line was given retirement together. Perreault's No. 11 was lowered and then raised back in the center under the French Connection banner, as shown above.
 SHK III and NRK (team founders Seymour H. Knox III and Northrup R. Knox. Two banners bearing their initials and the Sabres blue and gold reside in the KeyBank Center's rafters.)
 RJ (longtime play-by-play announcer Rick Jeanneret. A banner bearing his initials was raised on April 1, 2022.)
 Although Alexander Mogilny's number 89 is not officially retired by the team, it has only been issued once since his departure following the 1995 season, to Alex Tuch in 2021. Cory Conacher switched to 88 expressly out of deference to Mogilny in 2014. Likewise, Ryan Miller, who traditionally wears 39, wore 30 during his time with the Sabres out of deference to Hasek, long before 39 was announced to be retired. Miller's number 30 would also eventually be retired on January 19, 2023.
The NHL retired Wayne Gretzky's No. 99 for all its member teams at the 2000 NHL All-Star Game.

 Buffalo Sabres Hall of Fame 

1980
 Frank Christie
 Roger Crozier
 George "Punch" Imlach
1982
 Tim Horton
 Fred T. Hunt
1986
 David Forman
 Don Luce
 Craig Ramsay
1989
 Rick Martin
 Gilbert Perreault
 Rene Robert
1994
 Danny Gare
1995
 Jim Schoenfeld
 Robert O. Swados

1996
 Ted Darling
 Seymour H. Knox III
 Northrup R. Knox
1998
 Jack Gatecliff
 Larry Playfair
2000
 Don Edwards
 Bill Hajt
 Wayne Redshaw
 Robert "Rip" Simonick
2001
 Jerry Korab
 Mike Racicot
 Mike Ramsey
2005
 Mike Foligno
 Dick Johnston
 Pat LaFontaine
 Rudy Migay
 Robert E. Rich, Jr.
 George Strawbridge

2007
 Phil Housley
2009
 Dave Andreychuk
 Milt Ellis
2010
 Joe Crozier
 Jim Lorentz
2011
 Alexander Mogilny
 Jim Kelley
2012
 Dale Hawerchuk
 Rick Jeanneret
2014
Dominik Hasek
2023
Ryan Miller

 Scoring leaders 
 Regular season scoring leaders 

These are the top-ten-point-scorers in franchise regular season history. Figures are updated after each completed NHL regular season.
  – current Sabres player

Franchise single-season records

 Most goals: Alexander Mogilny, 76 (1992–93)
 Most assists: Pat LaFontaine, 95 (1992–93)
 Most points: Pat LaFontaine, 148 (1992–93)
 Most penalty minutes: Rob Ray, 354 (1991–92)
 Most goals, defenseman: Phil Housley, 31 (1983–84)
 Most assists, defenseman: Phil Housley, 60 (1989–90)
 Most points, defenseman: Phil Housley, 81 (1989–90)
 Most goals, rookie: Rick Martin, 44 (1971–72)
 Most assists, rookie: Phil Housley, 47 (1982–83)
 Most points, rookie: Rick Martin, 74 (1971–72)
 Most wins: Ryan Miller, 41 (2009–10)
 Most shutouts: Dominik Hasek, 13 (1997–98)

 NHL awards and trophies Presidents' Trophy 2006–07Prince of Wales Trophy 1974–75, 1979–80, 1998–99Bill Masterton Memorial Trophy Don Luce: 1974–75
 Pat LaFontaine: 1994–95Calder Memorial Trophy Gilbert Perreault: 1970–71
 Tom Barrasso: 1983–84
 Tyler Myers: 2009–10Frank J. Selke Trophy Craig Ramsay: 1984–85
 Michael Peca: 1996–97Hart Memorial Trophy Dominik Hasek: 1996–97, 1997–98Jack Adams Award Ted Nolan: 1996–97
 Lindy Ruff: 2005–06King Clancy Memorial Trophy Rob Ray: 1998–99Lady Byng Memorial Trophy Gilbert Perreault: 1972–73Lester B. Pearson Award Dominik Hasek: 1996–97, 1997–98Lester Patrick Trophy Pat LaFontaine: 1996–97
 Scotty Bowman: 2000–01NHL Plus/Minus Award Thomas Vanek: 2006–07Vezina Trophy Don Edwards and Bob Sauve: 1979–80
 Tom Barrasso: 1983–84
 Dominik Hasek: 1993–94, 1994–95, 1996–97, 1997–98, 1998–99, 2000–01
 Ryan Miller: 2009–10William M. Jennings Trophy'''
 Tom Barrasso and Bob Sauve: 1984–85
 Dominik Hasek and Grant Fuhr: 1993–94
 Dominik Hasek: 2000–01

References 
Notes

Citations

External links 
 
 
 Buffalo Sabres Alumni Association

 
1970 establishments in New York (state)
Atlantic Division (NHL)
Bankruptcy in the United States
Companies that filed for Chapter 11 bankruptcy in 2003
Ice hockey clubs established in 1970
Ice hockey teams in New York (state)
Pegula Sports and Entertainment
Sports in Buffalo, New York
Tourist attractions in Buffalo, New York
National Hockey League teams